The TBP-associated factors (TAF) are proteins that associate with the TATA-binding protein in transcription initiation. It is a part of the transcription initiation factor TFIID multimeric protein complex. It also makes up many other factors, including SL1. They mediate the formation of the transcription preinitiation complex, a step preceding transcription of DNA to RNA by RNA polymerase II.

TAFs have a signature N-terminal histone-like fold domain (HFD). This domain is implicated in the pairwise interaction among specific TAFs.

Function

TFIID
TFIID plays a central role in mediating promoter responses to various activators and repressors. It binds tightly to TAFII-250 and directly interacts with TAFII-40. TFIID is composed of TATA binding protein (TBP) and a number of TBP-associated factors (TAFS).

TAF is part of the TFIID complex, and interacts with the following:
 Specific transcriptional activators
 Basal transcription factors
 Other TAFIIs
 Specific DNA sequences, for example the downstream promoter element or gene-specific core promoter sequence

Due to such interactions, they contribute transcription activation and to promoter selectivity.

Some pairs of TAF interact with each other to form "lobes" in TFIID. Pairs known or suggested to exist in TFIID include TAF6-TAF9, TAF4-TAF12, TAF11-13, TAF8-TAF10 and TAF3-TAF10.

SL1
Selective factor 1 is composed of the TATA-binding protein and three TAF (TATA box-binding protein-associated factor) subunits (TAF1A, TAF1B, and TAF1C). These TAFs do not have a histone-like fold domain.

Other complexes 

TAF is a part of SAGA (SPT-ADA-GCN5 acetylase) and related coactivation complexes. Such complexes acetylate histone tails to activate genes. Human has three SAGA-like complexes: PCAF, TFTC (TBP-free TAF-containing complex), and STAGA (SPT3-TAF9-GCN5L acetylase). PCAF (GCN5) and KAT2A (GCN5L) are two human homologs of the yeast Gcn5.

TAF8, TAF10, and SPT7L forms a small TAF complex called SMAT.

Structure 
The N-terminal domain of TAF has a histone-like protein fold. It contains two short alpha helices and a long central alpha helix.

Human genes

 TAF1 (TAFII250)
 TAF2 (CIF150)
 TAF3 (TAFII140)
 TAF4 (TAFII130/135)
 TAF4B (TAFII105)
 TAF5 (TAFII100)
 TAF6 (TAFII70/80)
 TAF6L (PAF65A)
 TAF7 (TAFII55)
 TAF8 (TAFII43)
 TAF9 (TAFII31/32)
 TAF9B (TAFII31L)
 TAF10 (TAFII30)
 TAF11 (TAFII28)
 TAF12 (TAFII20/15)
 TAF13 (TAFII18)
 TAF15 (TAFII68)

Assorted signatures 
TAF domains are spread out across many digital signatures:

References 

Protein domains